Hispanic is a term for the people and culture of Spain and other Spanish-speaking countries.

Hispanic may also refer to:

 Hispanic (magazine)
 Spanish people
 The quality of Hispanidad
 Hispanophone or Spanish-speaking countries
 People or things originating in the Roman province of Hispania

See also
 
 Hispanic America
 Hispanic Americans
 Hispanic culture in The Philippines
 Hispano (disambiguation)
 Spanish language in the United States